The Shine Girl is a lost 1916 American silent film drama directed by William Parke and starring Gladys Hulette. It was produced by the Thanhouser Company and was distributed by Pathé Exchange.

Cast
Gladys Hulette as The shine girl
Wayne Arey as Judge Clayton
Kathryn Adams as Margaret Kenyon
Ethelmary Oakland as Baby Kenyon
John Cook as John Kenyon
Blanche Davenport

References

External links

1916 films
American silent feature films
Lost American films
American black-and-white films
Silent American drama films
1916 drama films
1916 lost films
Lost drama films
1910s American films
1910s English-language films
English-language drama films